Gurbax Singh Frank (1 September 1935 – 14 April 2022) was a Punjabi scholar and translator. In 2011, he was awarded the Sahitya Akademi Translation Prize for his book, 'Bharat Nikki Kahani', an anthology of short stories of various Indian languages.

Biography 
Frank completed his PhD on the short stories of Kartar Singh Duggal from Institute of Oriental Studies, Moscow, in 1975. He spent a total of 10 years in Soviet Union (1969-76 and 1988-1991) and translated literary works of Russian authors like Rasul Gamzatov, Boris Polevoy, Chinghiz Aitmatov, Leo Tolstoy, Maxim Gorky, V Pannova, and Mikhail Lermontov into Punjabi. 

He became a professor at the Guru Nanak Dev University in 1979 and retired as head of the department in 1995.

He died on 14 April 2022 in Amritsar.

Works

Punjabi translations 

 Mera Dagistan (My Dagestan by Rasul Gamzatov)
 Padri Sergei (Father Sergei by Leo Tolstoy)
 Buzil (Hungarian novel by Imre Sarkadi, 1997)

Criticism 
 Sabhyachar te Punjabi Sabhyachar
 Sambad—1
 1984

References 

1935 births
2022 deaths
Writers from Punjab, India
Recipients of the Sahitya Akademi Prize for Translation